Moscow was a Russian UCI Continental cycling team.

Major wins
2009
Grand Prix of Moscow, Alexander Khatuntsev
Overall Bałtyk–Karkonosze Tour, Sergey Kolesnikov

References

Defunct cycling teams based in Russia
Sports clubs in Moscow
Cycling teams established in 2009
Cycling teams disestablished in 2010
UCI Continental Teams (Europe)
2009 establishments in Russia
2010 disestablishments in Russia